Utriculofera is a genus of moths in the subfamily Arctiinae erected by George Hampson in 1893.

Description
Palpi porrect (extending forward) and reaching beyond the frontal tuft. Antennae of male with a very hollowed-out vesicle after the basal joint, with ciliated terminal. Abdomen has a pair of lateral long hair tufts arise from the third segment. Tibia with long spurs. Forewings with arched costa from near the base. The outer margin straight. Male has a basal fold containing tufts of hair in the inner margin. Vein 3 from before angle of cell, veins 4 and 5 from close to angle and vein 6 from below upper angle. Veins 7 to 9 stalked. Hindwings with vein 4 from angle of cell, vein 5 from above angle and vein 3 absent. Veins 6 and 7 stalked and vein 8 arise near end of cell.

Species
 Utriculofera aplaga Hampson, 1900
 Utriculofera fuscapex Hampson, 1893
 Utriculofera leucogrammus Rothschild, 1916
 Utriculofera macroplaga Hampson, 1900
 Utriculofera muricolor Rothschild, 1913
 Utriculofera utricularia Rothschild, 1912
 Utriculofera variegata Rothschild, 1912

Former species
 Utriculofera tetrastigmata Rothschild, 1916

References

Lithosiini
Moth genera